John Barber Sheridan (18 September 1898 – 15 August 1930) was an Australian rules footballer who played with Geelong in the Victorian Football League (VFL).

Notes

External links 

1898 births
1930 deaths
Australian rules footballers from Geelong
Geelong Football Club players